Llandawke is a small settlement in Carmarthenshire, Wales, situated roughly 1 mile from Laugharne, toward Tenby.

It contains the now redunandant 13th century church of St Odoceus, which lay within the parish toward nearby Laugharne.

See also

List of places in Carmarthenshire

References

Villages in Carmarthenshire